Water Sports is an EP by DIN, released in 1993 by DOVe.

Track listing

Personnel
Adapted from the Water Sport liner notes.

DIN
 Jean-Claude Cutz (as Din) – vcoals, synthesizer, drum programming

Additional performers
 Dave Rout – drum programming (A1)

Release history

References

External links 
 

1993 EPs
DIN (musician) albums